OverActive Media (OAM), previously known as The Ledger Group, is a esports and entertainment company that fields teams across multiple esports titles through its subsidiaries, including the Overwatch League and Call of Duty League. They also own esports organization MAD Lions, competing in Counter-Strike: Global Offensive and League of Legends as part of Spain's SuperLiga Orange and the League of Legends European Championship, respectively.

History 
OverActive Media's was originally branded as The Ledger Group, a Toronto-based group focused on blockchain-enabled companies. In April 2018, the company announced that it would look to expand in esports franchises. The Ledger Group went on to make investments in Askott Entertainment and Enthusiast Gaming, and after a $1.5 million investment in Splyce, they shifted from an investment platform to an ownership platform and rebranded to OverActive Media. In 2018, OAM and Splyce agreed to purchase a team, later branded as the Toronto Defiant, in the Overwatch League for the league's upcoming 2019 season. On November 21, 2018, OAM announced that it entered an agreement in principle to acquire Splyce. In 2019, OAM purchased a franchise spot in Activion-Blizzard's Call of Duty League, establishing Toronto Ultra.

In July 2020, ESPN reported that OverActive Media would be building a 7,000- to 10,000-seat esports arena at Exhibition Place in Toronto to serve as the home arena to the Toronto Defiant and Toronto Ultra. The report was confirmed in February 2021, as OverActive Media announced the venue. The $500 million project is expected to be the home arena for their esports teams, as well as host mid-sized music concerts and other events. OAM was given full approval by the Toronto City Council as of December 16, 2021. The arena is expected to break ground in 2022 and is expected to be completed in 2025.

References

External links
 OverActive Media (company website)

Esports organizations
Toronto Defiant